SF Digest was a small bedsheet magazine published by New English Library, intended to become a quarterly publication. The magazine was aimed at a more mature readership than its predecessor, putting more emphasis on fiction than the more artwork orientated Science Fiction Monthly. The editor for the one and only issue was Julie Davis and the cover art was produced by David Bergen. After one issue of SF Digest was published, NEL made a decision to leave the science fiction magazine market.

References 

 

Science fiction magazines established in the 1970s
1976 establishments in the United Kingdom
Defunct science fiction magazines published in the United Kingdom
Magazines established in 1976
Magazines disestablished in 1976